Kiekie is a Polynesian word, in some languages written as ieie. It can refer to:

Kiekie (plant), Freycinetia banksii, in New Zealand
Kiekie (clothing), an ornamental girdle around the hips, especially worn by women in Tonga
Kiekie (spider), a genus of wandering spiders